Kovrovsky Uyezd (Ковровский уезд) was one of the subdivisions of the Vladimir Governorate of the Russian Empire. It was situated in the eastern part of the governorate. Its administrative centre was Kovrov.

Demographics
At the time of the Russian Empire Census of 1897, Kovrovsky Uyezd had a population of 109,861. Of these, 99.8% spoke Russian as their native language.

References

 
Uezds of Vladimir Governorate
Vladimir Governorate